The primary sector of the economy includes any industry involved in the extraction and production of raw materials, such as farming, logging, fishing, forestry and mining.

The primary sector tends to make up a larger portion of the economy in developing countries than it does in developed countries. For example, in 2018, agriculture, forestry, and fishing comprised more than 15% of GDP in sub-Saharan Africa but less than 1% of GDP in North America.

In developed countries the primary sector has become more technologically advanced, enabling for example the mechanization of farming, as compared with lower-tech methods in poorer countries.  More developed economies may invest additional capital in primary means of production: for example, in the United States corn belt, combine harvesters pick the corn, and sprayers spray large amounts of insecticides, herbicides and fungicides, producing a higher yield than is possible using less capital-intensive techniques. These technological advances and investment allow the primary sector to employ a smaller workforce, so developed countries tend to have a smaller percentage of their workforce involved in primary activities, instead having a higher percentage involved in the secondary and tertiary sectors.

List of countries by agricultural output

See also

 Resource curse
 Three-sector model

References

Further reading
 Dwight H. Perkins: Proceedings of the Academy of Political Science, Vol. 31, No. 1, China's Developmental Experience (Mar., 1973)
 Cameron: General Economic and Social History
 Historia Económica y Social General, by Maria Inés Barbero, Rubén L. Berenblum, Fernando R. García Molina, Jorge Saborido

External links

Economy101.net: The Nature of Wealth

 
+1
+1
National accounts
Resource economics
World economy